was a town located in Ōtsu District, Yamaguchi Prefecture, Japan.

As of 2003, the town had an estimated population of 4,602 and a density of 102.68 persons per km². The total area was 44.82 km².

On March 22, 2005, Heki, along with the towns of Misumi and Yuya (all from Ōtsu District), was merged into the expanded city of Nagato.

External links
 Nagato official website

References 

Dissolved municipalities of Yamaguchi Prefecture